
Gmina Somonino is a rural gmina (administrative district) in Kartuzy County, Pomeranian Voivodeship, in northern Poland.

The gmina contains part of the protected area called Kashubian Landscape Park.

Villages
Gmina Somonino contains the villages and settlements of Borcz, Borcz-Leśniczówka, Chylowa Huta, Dębowo, Egiertowo, Goręczyno, Graniczny Dwór, Hopowo, Jeknica, Kamela, Kaplica, Kolańska Huta, Koszowatka, Lisia Góra, Mały Dwór, Nowy Dwór, Ostowo, Ostrzyce, Patoka, Piotrowo, Połęczyno, Pstra Suka, Ramleje, Rąty, Rokitki, Rybaki, Sarni Dwór-Leśniczówka, Sarnówko, Sławki, Sławki Górne, Somonino, Stacja Wieżyca, Starkowa Huta, Stary Dwór, Trątkownica, Wyczechowo and Wyczechowo-Osady.

Neighbouring gminas
Gmina Somonino is bordered by the gminas of Kartuzy, Kościerzyna, Nowa Karczma, Przywidz, Stężyca and Żukowo.

References
Polish official population figures 2006

Somonino
Kartuzy County